Sans Pareil is a steam locomotive that took part in the 1829 Rainhill Trials.

Sans Pareil may also refer to:

 A Spanish-French wine grape also known as Grenache
 A French wine grape known as Jurançon
 The original name of the Adelphi Theatre in London, founded in 1806
 Any of five ships of the French Navy, see French ship Sans Pareil
 Any of three ships of the Royal Navy, see HMS Sans Pareil
 Sanspareil, a landscape garden in Germany

See also 
 Nonpareil (disambiguation)